Pauline Lacroix (27 February 1892 – 29 December 1977) was a French painter. Her work was part of the painting event in the art competition at the 1924 Summer Olympics.

References

1892 births
1964 deaths
19th-century French painters
20th-century French painters
French women painters
Olympic competitors in art competitions
Painters from Paris
20th-century French women